Mild and Hazy is a 7" vinyl single by the Canadian singer-songwriter Hayden. It was released in 1996 on Hayden's own label, Hardwood Records as well as on Lunamoth. The cover is a photograph of Hayden as a toddler. The song "Gouge Away" is a cover of the Pixies' song, from their album Doolittle.

Track listing
All songs written by Paul Hayden Desser, except where noted.

Side A:
 "In September" – 2:38
 "Mild" – 1:04
Side B:
 "Gouge Away" (Black Francis) – 2:48
 "Hazy" – 1:06

Notes 

1996 songs